Sighișoara (Transylvanian Saxon: Schäsbrich, Šesburχ, or Scheessprich;) is a municipality on the Târnava Mare River in Mureș County, central Romania. Located in the historic region of Transylvania, Sighișoara had a population of 28,102 according to the 2011 census. It is a popular tourist destination for its well-preserved old town, which is listed by UNESCO as a World Heritage Site. The town administers seven villages, more specifically: Angofa, Aurel Vlaicu, Hetiur, Rora, Șoromiclea, Venchi, and Viilor.

History 

Starting with the mid 12th century, German craftsmen and merchants known as the Transylvanian Saxons were invited to Transylvania by the then King of Hungary, Géza II, to settle and defend the frontier of his realm and improve the region's economy. The chronicler Krauss lists a Saxon settlement in present-day Sighișoara by 1191. A document of 1280 records a town built on the site of a Roman fort as Castrum Sex or "six-sided camp", referring to the fort's shape of an irregular hexagon. Other names recorded include Schaäsburg (1282), Schespurg (1298) and Segusvar (1300). By 1337 Sighișoara had become a royal center for the kings, who awarded the settlement urban status in 1367 as the Civitas de Segusvar.

The town played an important strategic and commercial role at the edges of Central Europe for several centuries. Sighișoara became one of the most important urban centres of Transylvania, with artisans from throughout the Holy Roman Empire visiting the settlement. The German artisans and craftsmen dominated the urban economy, as well as building the fortifications protecting it. It is estimated that during the 16th and 17th centuries Sighișoara had as many as 15 guilds and 20 handicraft branches. The Baroque sculptor Elias Nicolai lived in the town. The Wallachian voivode Vlad Dracul (father of Vlad the Impaler), who lived in exile in the town, had coins minted in the town (otherwise coinage was the monopoly of the Hungarian kings in the Kingdom of Hungary) and issued the first document listing the city's Romanian name, Sighișoara. The Romanian name is first attested in 1435, and derives from the Hungarian Segesvár, where vár is "fort".

The town was the setting for George I Rákóczi's election as Prince of Transylvania and King of Hungary in 1631. Sighișoara suffered military occupation, fires, and plagues during the 17th and 18th centuries. An important source for the history of 17th-century Transylvania, for the period of 1606–1666, are the records of Georg Kraus, the town's notary.

The nearby plain of Albești was the site of the Battle of Segesvár, where the revolutionary Hungarian army led by Józef Bem was defeated by the Russian army led by Luders on 31 July 1849. A monument was constructed in 1852 to the Russian general Skariatin, who died in the battle. The Hungarian poet Sándor Petőfi is generally believed to have been killed in the battle, and a monument was constructed in his honor at Albești in 1897. After World War I Sighișoara passed with Transylvania from Austria-Hungary to the Kingdom of Romania.

Central Sighișoara has preserved in an exemplary way the features of a small medieval fortified town. It has been listed by UNESCO as a World Heritage Site. Each year, a medieval Festival takes place in the old citadel in July.

In Eastern Europe and Southeastern Europe, Sighișoara is one of the few fortified towns that are still inhabited. The town is made up of two parts. The medieval stronghold was built on top of a hill and is known as the Citadel. The lower town lies in the valley of Târnava Mare river.

The houses inside Sighișoara Citadel show the main features of a craftsmen's town. However, there are some houses that belonged to the former patriciate, like the Venetian House and the House with Antlers.

Between 2001 and 2003, the construction of a Dracula theme park in the Braite nature preserve near Sighișoara was considered but ultimately rejected, owing to the strong opposition of local civil society groups and national and international media as well as politically influential persons, as the theme park would have detracted from the medieval style of the city and would have destroyed the nature preserve.

Demographics and name 

Ethnic groups in 2011:
 Romanians (75%)
 Hungarians (17.6%)
 Roma (5.3%)
 Germans (more specifically Transylvanian Saxons) (1.5%)

Sights 

Sighișoara is a popular tourist destination for its well-preserved walled old town, which is also listed by UNESCO as a World Heritage Site. The main Citadel's attractions are certainly the towers.

Towers 

According to ancient military architectures writings, the defence towers had to be a fortification system for the mutual defense, and, at the same time, each tower was supposed to be an independent fortress: a break at the base of a tower did not mean entering into the city, capturing a tower did not have to lead to the conquest of the city. Most of these towers were hollow and equipped with elevators and underground galleries.
 Sighișoara Clock Tower (Turnul cu Ceas) – the landmark of the city is a 64 m-high tower built in the 13th century. Today it is a museum of history.
 The Tinsmiths' Tower (Turnul Cositorarilor)
 The Butchers' Tower (Turnul Măcelarilor)
 The Bootmakers' Tower
 The Tailors' Tower (Turnul Croitorilor) 
 The Furriers' Tower (Turnul Cojocarilor)
 The Ironsmiths' Tower (Turnul Fierarilor) 
 The Ropemakers' Tower (Turnul Frânghierilor)
 The Tanners' Tower (Turnul Tăbăcarilor) 
 The Face Tower – tower on the route to Târgu Mureș, out of the citadel, but still worth visiting thanks to its story.

Churches 

 The church on the hill (Biserica din Deal) – is undoubtedly one of the most valuable architectural monuments of the city and has been one of the most representative buildings of the gothic site of Romania. 
 The Monastery Church (Biserica Mânăstirii Dominicane) –  is a gothic style architectural monument which is placed in the neighbourhood of the Clock tower and it was built at the beginning of the 13th century. It is the only church without a bell: the reason is basically that the Saxons weren't great spenders and thought that one bell, the one of the Church on the hill, was enough for the whole city.
 The Saint Joseph Roman Catholic church
 Leprosy Church (Biserica Leproșilor)
 The Orthodox Cathedral of Sighișoara (Catedrala Ortodoxă)
 The old Orthodox church

Civil architecture 

Most of the 164 houses in the town having at least 300 years are considered historical monuments, as follows: those in the Town Square (or Citadel Square), with its rectangular plan, was once inhabited by noble families of the town, though it has undergone too many transformations over time. The best houses are the ones that have kept their original shape.

 House on the Rock (Casa de pe stâncă)  
 House with shingles (Evert) – is dedicated to craftsmen for Educational Interethnic Centre for Youth.
 Venetian House or Green House (Casa Venețiană) 
 Vlad Dracul's House 
 Sighișoara City Hall 
 Sighișoara hotel complex – built between 1886 and 1889 was the seat of city hall.
 Indoor wooden staircase or the Scholar's Stairs
 School on the Hill 
 The Stag House (Casa cu Cerb)
 The Citadel Square (Piața Cetăți)
 Casa Asociatiei Mestesugaresti (La Perla)
 Joseph B. Teusch Building (Hotel Central Park)

Natives 

 Johann Michael Ackner, Transylvanian Saxon archaeologist
 Doina Cojocaru, handball player
 Friedrich Grünanger, architect
 Ralph Gunesch, former professional German football player
 Adrian Ivanițchi, folk guitarist
 Johannes Kelpius, a German intellectual, musician, and mystic who founded a religious community when he immigrated to the American colony of Pennsylvania in the late seventeenth century
 Gabriel Mureșan, footballer
 Marie Stritt, German feminist and suffragist
 Georg Daniel Teutsch, Lutheran bishop
 Vlad III the Impaler, prince of Wallachia, inspiration for fictional vampire Count Dracula
 Radu Voina, former handball player, currently coach

International relations

Twin towns – sister cities
Sighișoara is twinned with:

Gallery

See also 
 List of Hungarian exonyms (Mureș County)

Notes

External links 

 360° Panoramic Images of Sighișoara - Part 1 and Part 2
 
 TOP 10 Guides: Best of Sighișoara
 Lets Go To Romania
 Sighișoara 360 Virtual Tour & Medieval Festival photo gallery
 Sighișoara Pictures
 Sighișoara, Romania: The Purported Home Of Dracula – slideshow by The Huffington Post
 Images from Sighișoara by Canadian Photographer Carey Nash 
 (2012) HDR Photos of Sighișoara by Moldavian Photographer Dumitru Brinzan
 Tourist informations, photo gallery and webcam from Sighisoara

 
Cities in Romania
Populated places in Mureș County
Localities in Transylvania
Capitals of former Romanian counties
Populated places established in the 12th century